The Northwest Crossroads Conference is a six-member IHSAA-sanctioned athletic conference. Five of the six institutions are in Lake County, while the sixth, Kankakee Valley, is in neighboring Jasper County. This conference was created in 2007, following the disbandment of the Lake Athletic Conference.  Griffith left the conference after the 2016–17 school year to join the Greater South Shore Athletic Conference (IHSAA).

Hanover Central, in southern Lake County, plans to join the conference as its seventh member starting in 2023.

Membership

Conference Championships

Football

Boys Basketball

Girls Basketball

Girls Golf

State Championships

Andrean (18)
 1998 Softball (2A)
 2004 Football (3A)
 2005 Baseball (3A)
 2007 Softball (3A)
 2009 Baseball (3A)
 2010 Baseball (3A)
 2012 Softball (3A)
 2013 Football (3A)
 2014 Baseball (3A)
 2015 Baseball (3A)
 2016 Girls Soccer (1A)
 2017 Girls Volleyball (2A)
 2018 Baseball (3A)
 2019 Boys basketball (2A)
 2019 Baseball (3A)
 2021 Girls Volleyball (2A)
 2021 Football (2A)
 2022 Baseball (3A)

Griffith (1)
 1997 Football (4A)

Highland (0)

Hobart (7)
 1957 Boys Cross Country
 1960 Boys Cross Country
 1987 Football (4A)
 1989 Football (4A)
 1991 Football (4A)
 1993 Football (4A)
 2004 Gymnastics

Kankakee Valley (0)

Lowell (1)
 2005 Football (4A)

Munster (11)
 1973 Boys Swimming & Diving
 1974 Boys Swimming & Diving
 1975 Boys Swimming & Diving
 1976 Boys Swimming & Diving
 1976 Girls Swimming & Diving
 1977 Boys Swimming & Diving
 1977 Girls Swimming & Diving
 1978 Girls Swimming & Diving
 1979 Boys Swimming & Diving
 1980 Boys Swimming & Diving
 2002 Baseball (4A)

Resources 
 IHSAA Conferences
 IHSAA Directory

Indiana high school athletic conferences
High school sports conferences and leagues in the United States
2007 establishments in Indiana